Peugh may refer to:

Peugh v. Davis 1885 U.S. Supreme Court case
William Peugh, American architect, designed of San Francisco landmark 100 Montgomery Street

See also
Pugh (disambiguation)
PU (disambiguation)